The 1950 Drake Bulldogs football team was an American football team that represented Drake University as a member of the Missouri Valley Conference during the 1950 college football season. In its second season under head coach Warren Gaer, the team compiled a 6–2–1 record (1–2–1 against MVC opponents), tied for fourth place in the conference, and outscored opponents by a total of 247 to 117. The team played its home games at Drake Stadium in Des Moines, Iowa.

Drake halfback Johnny Bright led the nation in total offense in both 1949 and 1950. See List of NCAA major college football yearly total offense leaders. He was the second Africa-American athlete to lead the country in this category after Kenny Washington did so in 1939. Bright later played 11 seasons in the Canadian Football League and was inducted into both the College Football Hall of Fame and the Canadian Football Hall of Fame.

Schedule

References

Drake
Drake Bulldogs football seasons
Drake Bulldogs football